Benjamin W. Schenck (August 12, 1837 – February 19, 1916) was a Union Army soldier in the American Civil War who received the U.S. military's highest decoration, the Medal of Honor.

Schenck was born in Butler County, Ohio on August 12, 1837, and entered service at Maroa, Illinois. He was awarded the Medal of Honor, for extraordinary heroism on May 22, 1863, while serving as a Private with Company D, 116th Illinois Volunteer Infantry Regiment, at Vicksburg, Mississippi. His Medal of Honor was issued on August 14, 1894.

He died at the age of 78, on February 19, 1916, and was buried at the Greenwood Cemetery in Decatur, Illinois.

Medal of Honor citation

References

External links
 

1837 births
1916 deaths
People from Butler County, Ohio
Burials in Illinois
Union Army soldiers
United States Army Medal of Honor recipients
American Civil War recipients of the Medal of Honor
People of Illinois in the American Civil War